This is a list of television programs currently and formerly broadcast by the children's cable television channel Nicktoons, a sister network to Nickelodeon in the United States.

Current programming

Programming from Nickelodeon

An asterisk (*) indicates that the program has or had new episodes aired on Nicktoons.

Animated ("Nicktoons")

Live-action

Preschool

Acquired programming from Nickelodeon

Animated

Former programming

Original programming
{| class="wikitable sortable" style="text-align:center;"
|-
! Title !! Premiere date !! Finale date !! Date(s) reran !! Notes
|-
| scope="row" style="text-align:left; | Nicktoons Film Festival ||  || ||  ||
|-
| scope="row" style="text-align:left;" | Shorts in a Bunch ||  ||  ||  ||
|-
| scope="row" style="text-align:left; | Making Fiends ||  || || 2008–16 ||
|-
| scope="row" style="text-align:left;" | Random! Cartoons ||  ||  || 2009–14 ||
|}

Acquired programming
Viacom licensed much of Nicktoons' programming from unrelated companies in temporary broadcast deals. Exceptions included 4Kids' Teenage Mutant Ninja Turtles series (which Viacom purchased along with the rights to the TMNT franchise)

Anime

Animated

Live-action

Programming from Nickelodeon

An asterisk (*) indicates that the program had new episodes aired on Nicktoons.

Animated ("Nicktoons")

Live-action

Game shows

Preschool

Acquired programming from Nickelodeon

Animated

Live-action

See also
 List of programs broadcast by Nickelodeon
 List of programs broadcast by Nick at Nite
 List of programs broadcast by Nick Jr.
 List of programs broadcast by TeenNick
 List of Nickelodeon original films
 List of Nickelodeon short films
 Nicktoons

Notes

References

Nicktoons (TV channel) original series
Nicktoons
Nickelodeon-related lists